Salar Abdoh is an Iranian novelist and essayist. He is the author of the novels The Poet Game (2000), Opium (2004), Tehran At Twilight (2014), and the editor and translator of the anthology Tehran Noir (2014). He is also a director of the graduate program in Creative Writing at the City College of New York at the City University of New York.

Early life
Salar Abdoh was born in Tehran, Iran and also spent some time in England. When Abdoh was fourteen his family was forced to leave Iran for the US. Abdoh earned an undergraduate degree from U.C. Berkeley and received a Master's from the City College of New York.

Career
Abdoh's first novel, The Poet Game, focuses on a young agent sent by a top-secret Iranian government agency to infiltrate a group of Islamic extremists in New York in order to keep them from acts of terror that might draw the US into a war in the Middle East. Though the book was published in 2000, it received far greater attention following the September 11, 2001 attack on the World Trade Center. His second novel, Opium (2004) tells the story of a young American who used to work as a drug-runner along the Afghan/Iran border during the Soviet occupation of Afghanistan. Years later, living in New York and trying to keep a low profile, his past suddenly catches up with him as the US is gearing up to invade Afghanistan and Iraq. Abdoh has also published short stories and essays on war and politics in numerous journals; in 2010 he edited Callaloo Journal's issue of Middle East and North Africa writers. For his prose he has won the New York Foundation for the Arts award in 2008 and the National Endowment for the Arts award in 2010.

Abdoh also co-wrote the play Quotations from a Ruined City with his older brother, Reza Abdoh, the world famous avant-garde theater director. The play was first produced in 1994.

References

External links
 On taking a bullet for another in war
 On the fight against ISIS at Tel Afar
 On homelessness and hunger in America
 On being a female journalist in Tehran
 The Millions' article
 Article on Martyrs and commanders
 Article on cost of war in the Middle East
 Author statement on the writing of Tehran At Twilight
 Salar Abdoh's introduction to the Tehran Noir anthology: The Seismic City
 An Article by Salar Abdoh about a public execution in Tehran
 Salar Abdoh about covering the 'War on Drugs' in Afghanistan
 Fiction by Salar Abdoh about the Iran-Iraq War
 Salar Abdoh on Majed Neisi about the Afghan civil war
 Salar Abdoh on the 2009 demonstrations in Tehran
 Fiction by Salar Abdoh in Tremors-Anthology of Iranian-American Fiction, Asia Society, 2013
 Faber & Faber author page
 Interview
 Excerpt from The Poet Game
 Essay on September 11
 Three part series of articles on Iran:
 Moving Violations
 Vanishing Point
 Irrational Waiting
   NEA Writer's Corner Writer's Statement
  

Year of birth missing (living people)
Living people
Iranian emigrants to the United States
University of California, Berkeley alumni
City College of New York alumni
Writers from Tehran
Iranian male short story writers
21st-century Iranian short story writers
21st-century American male writers